Furcinetechma labonitae is a species of moth of the family Tortricidae. It is found in Ecuador (Sucumbios Province).

The ground colour of the forewings is white with ochreous cream and yellow-brown suffusions and black spots. The markings are yellowish brown with black spots and blotches. The hindwings are whitish, suffused with pale brownish in the posterior half and with greyish strigulation.

Etymology
The species name refers to the type locality.

References

External links

Moths described in 2009
Endemic fauna of Ecuador
Euliini
Moths of South America
Taxa named by Józef Razowski